Lü Wenjun (born 11 March 1989) is a Chinese footballer who currently plays for Shanghai SIPG as a right-footed left winger in the Chinese Super League.

Club career
Lü Wenjun started his football career when he joined the Genbao Football Academy in 2000 and was promoted to Shanghai SIPG's first team during the 2006 season. He became a regular for the club as Shanghai won promotion to the second tier in the 2007 season. He was linked with a move to top tier side Tianjin Teda at the end of the 2011 season but decided to stay at the club. Lü scored six goals in 29 appearances in the 2012 season as Shanghai clinched the second tier league title and was subsequently promoted to the top flight.

Career statistics
.

Honours

Club
Shanghai SIPG
Chinese Super League: 2018
China League One: 2012
China League Two: 2007
Chinese FA Super Cup: 2019

References

External links
 

1989 births
Living people
Chinese footballers
Footballers from Shanghai

Shanghai Port F.C. players
Chinese Super League players
China League One players
China League Two players
Association football forwards
Footballers at the 2010 Asian Games
Asian Games competitors for China